Lois Neilson (September 7, 1895 – July 9, 1990) was an American silent movie actress who became actor and comedian Stan Laurel's first wife.

She was born in Tulare, California. Her family moved to Santa Cruz, California in 1909, where she entered high school in 1910. She acted in high school drama productions alongside ZaSu Pitts. Pitts invited Neilson to join her in Hollywood in 1918, where she began to appear in silent films. She and Laurel both appeared in Do You Love Your Wife? in 1919.

Neilson and Laurel began sharing her apartment in 1925, and married on August 13, 1926. Their daughter, also named Lois, was born on December 10, 1927. Their son, also named Stanley, was born two months premature in 1930, and lived for only nine days. Neilson and Laurel divorced in December 1934. Through her daughter, she was the mother-in-law of Western actor Rand Brooks, best known for his role of Lucky Jenkins in the Hopalong Cassidy "B" films.

She died in Los Angeles at the age of 94 from natural causes. Daughter Lois died in 2017 at age 89.

External links

 
 

1895 births
1990 deaths
People from Tulare, California
American film actresses
American silent film actresses
20th-century American actresses